Repudi is a panchayat village in Guntur district of Andhra Pradesh, India.

See also 
Villages in Phirangi puram mandal

References 

Villages in Guntur district